Jacqueline Michele Alemany (born February 24, 1989) is an American journalist and political reporter, who is a congressional correspondent for The Washington Post. She previously authored Power Up, an early-morning newsletter, and covered policy issues including the opioid crisis. In 2021, she was appointed as the anchor of The Early 202, a political newsletter of The Washington Post.

Early life and education 
Alemany was born in Scarsdale, New York, and attended Scarsdale High School. Her parents are Ellen (née Luciani) and Joaquin "Jack" Alemany. Her mother is the descendent of Italian immigrants and her father is the son of Catalan immigrants from Spain. Her mother served as president, chairman, and CEO of CIT Group.

Alemany graduated from Harvard University in 2011, with a degree in government. She was the Harvard Crimson women's basketball team captain during her senior year.

Journalism career 
Alemany started her career in the page program at CBS News, before being hired as a multimedia reporter in 2012, specializing in domestic and foreign affairs, politics, and general news. At CBS News, Alemany covered the 2016 presidential campaign as a digital reporter. As a TV network "embed" who lived in the primary state for much of the 2015 primary race, Alemany was included in the HuffPost documentary series New Hampshire.

Alemany was awarded an International Women's Media Foundation fellowship in 2017.

Alemany joined The Washington Post in 2018 after six years at CBS News to author PowerUp, an early-morning newsletter that focused on national politics, the White House and Congress. In 2021, she was appointed a congressional correspondent. Alemany also worked as a contributor at Vogue, and the Huffington Post. In September 2021, she was appointed as the anchor and contributor to The Early 202, a morning newsletter of The Washington Post.

References 

1989 births
Living people
Scarsdale High School alumni
Harvard College alumni
People from Scarsdale, New York
American women journalists
American people of Catalan descent
American people of Italian descent
Harvard Crimson women's basketball players
The Washington Post journalists